Marina Koshetz (August 6, 1912, Moscow – December 9, 2000, Santa Monica, California) was an American opera singer (soprano) and actress. She was the daughter of the prominent singer Nina Koshetz and the actor Alexander von Schubert. She used Marina Schubert as her name for her early film work.

Koshetz sang in staged opera. She also sang in films and wrote a biography about her mother as well as a screenplay about her mother's affair with Rachmaninoff, both titled The Last Love Song.

Selected filmography
Little Women (1933)
The Fountain (1934) 
British Agent (1934)
Millions in the Air (1935)
 Nights of Princes (1938)
Two Sisters from Boston (1946)
No Leave, No Love (1946)
Holiday in Mexico (1946)
Luxury Liner (1948)
The Great Caruso (1951)
Bells Are Ringing (1960)
Please Don't Eat the Daisies (1960)
The Glass Cage (1964)
The Busy Body (1967)
The Singing Nun (1967)

References

External links

 Marina Koshetz with her mother Nina at Getty Images
 Miss Marina Koshetz, painting by Ranken in 1932, biography

1912 births
2001 deaths
Death in California
American operatic sopranos
Emigrants from the Russian Empire to the United States
20th-century American actresses
20th-century American women writers
20th-century American women opera singers